Norrahammar Church is a church building in Norrahammar in Sweden. It belongs to Norrahammar Parish of the Church of Sweden. Opened in 1930, it was originally a chapel.

References

20th-century Church of Sweden church buildings
Churches in Jönköping Municipality
Churches completed in 1930
Churches in the Diocese of Växjö
1930 establishments in Sweden